The Battle of the Aisne is the name of three battles fought along the Aisne River in northern France during the First World War.
 First Battle of the Aisne (12–15 September 1914), Anglo-French counter-offensive following the First Battle of the Marne
 Second Battle of the Aisne (16 April–9 May 1917), main component of the Nivelle Offensive
 Third Battle of the Aisne (27 May–6 June 1918), third phase (Operation Blücher) of the German Spring Offensive